KTEE (94.9 FM, "The Tee") is a radio station broadcasting a Modern Adult Contemporary music format. Licensed to North Bend, Oregon, United States, the station is currently owned by Bicoastal Media Licenses III, LLC.

The call letters KTEE were previously licensed to Idaho Falls, Idaho.

References

External links

TEE
Modern adult contemporary radio stations
North Bend, Oregon
Radio stations established in 1980
1980 establishments in Oregon